Spirit of Adventure is a computer role playing game developed by Attic Entertainment Software and published February 12, 1991. The game is a 2.5D dungeon crawl.

External links
Spirit of Adventure at Atari Mania
Spirit of Adventure at Lemon Amiga
Polish site with pictures

1991 video games
Amiga games
Atari ST games
Attic Entertainment Software games
Commodore 64 games
DOS games
Role-playing video games
Single-player video games
Video games developed in Germany
Starbyte Software games